The New England Group 19 Rugby League competition is a Rugby league competition which is run under the auspices of the NSWRL, which absorbed the NSWCRL in 2019. It is based in the New England region. It was originally called the Group 5 Rugby League Premiership but that competition merged with another local competition to form New England Group 19. The competition is generally played on Sundays throughout the winter months, with strong local rivalries as well as inter – town rivalries.

History

Group 5 Rugby League 
Historically, rugby league in the Northern Tablelands and North West was administered under the Group 5 Rugby League banner.

Group 19 emerged from Group 5 in the early 1980s, and initially featured roughly half of all the clubs from the Northern Tablelands and North West NSW. Group 5 eventually merged into the Group 19 competition after the 1981 season and the league has been known as New England Group 19 ever since.

Group 19 Rugby League 
In the 1980s, Noel Cleal and his brother Les emerged from Warialda to rise to prominence in the NSWRL Premiership.

The early 1990s were dominated by the two Moree sides, the Boomerangs and Boars, before the Inverell, Warialda and Armidale Rams sides rose to the top of the league in the late 1990s. Guyra, known as the Super Spuds, won a hat trick of Premierships from 2002-2004.

Glen Innes, Tingha and Inverell dominated the late 2000s and early 2010s with the Moree Boomerangs emerging as the dominant side with back-to-back titles in 2013 and 2014.

In just their second season in Group 19 the MacIntyre Warriors claimed the A Grade honours, winning a tight contest over the returning Narwan Eels in 2017. The Eels returned to the competition after several years hiatus due to unruly supporters and unsportsmanlike behaviour.

Unfortunately the MacIntyre Warriors folded in 2018, as a result of many players rejoining the nearby Goondiwindi league side. Their absence paved the way for a return to the premiers circuit for the highly rated Moree Boomerangs, a team that wear their indigenous flag themed jerseys with much pride.

Guyra and Ashford folded after the COVID-19 plagued 2021 season, and Moree Boars left the year prior to join Group 4. Warialda, Tingha and a Uralla-Walcha joint venture rejoined the 2022 A Grade competition bringing the total to seven teams as Glen Innes entered a year's hiatus.

Clubs

Current clubs in Group 19 
The Tooheys New England Group 19 Premiership currently contains eleven clubs, two of which are in Armidale (the Armidale Rams and Narwan Eels), and nine from the surrounding area.

Former clubs

Part of Final 2nd Division Season in 2019 
  Ashford Roosters (promoted to A Grade 2020-21, then folded)
 Tenterfield Tigers (moved to QRL-administered Border Rugby League)
 Uralla Tigers (recess; currently fielding merged sides with Walcha)
 Walcha Roos (recess; currently fielding merged sides with Uralla)
(Plus Bingara, Bundarra, Guyra, Tingha and Warialda who have moved up to the A Grade competition)

Other Former Clubs 
  Gilgai Wolves (folded)
  Gwydir Gumbies (folded)
 Goondiwindi Boars (Toowoomba RL)
  MacIntyre Warriors (folded)
 Moree Boars (Group 4)
 Wright College Redmen Armidale (folded)
 YCW Armidale (folded)

Champions
Group 19 Rugby League Champions

Group 5 Rugby League
The competition in the area was previously known as Group 5. Once the Group 19 name became available after the demise of the previous competitions of that name, a breakaway competition 
from Group 5 became known as New England Group 19. Group 5 merged into this league two years later. The 'Moree' listed is the predecessor of the Moree Boars.

Group 5 Rugby League Champions

Group 19 Junior League

Current Teams 

  Armidale Rams
  Bingara Bullets (No seniors)
  Glen Innes Magpies
  Guyra Superspuds (No seniors)
  Inverell Hawks
  Moree Boars (Seniors: Group 4)
  Warialda Wombats

See also

Rugby League Competitions in Australia

References

www.whereistheleague.com.au

External links

Rugby league competitions in New South Wales